Anna's Dream is an American television film directed by Colin Bickley, starring former Caitlin's Way star Lindsay Felton as Anna Morgan and former So Weird star Cara DeLizia as Beth Morgan. It aired on Pax TV on September 20, 2002.

Plot
Eighteen-year-old Anna Morgan becomes a paraplegic after a gymnastics accident. Her whole world has changed. Anna has to repeat her junior year of high school after missing school to go to therapy, her boyfriend ignores her, she loses her friends, and her parents treat her like a helpless child. Anna is befriended by a stranger, whose life changed overnight. He tells Anna that she can't get her old life back, but he can offer her hope.

Cast
 Connie Sellecca as Leslie Morgan
 Richard Thomas as Roderick "Rod" Morgan
 Lindsay Felton as Anna Morgan
 Cara DeLizia as Elizabeth "Beth" Morgan
 Tyler Goucher as John Morgan
 Courtney Jines as Julie Morgan
 Matthew Newton as Neil Kennedy
 Don Franklin as Thomas "Tommy" Thompson

See also
 Elena Mukhina
 Julissa Gomez
 Sang Lan
 Little Girls in Pretty Boxes (film)

References

External links

2002 television films
2002 films
American drama television films
2002 drama films
Films about paraplegics or quadriplegics
2000s English-language films
2000s American films